Uddeholms AB is a multinational producer of high alloyed tool steel with production in Hagfors, Sweden. Since 1991, the company is part of the Austrian Böhler-Uddeholm group which in turn is part of the voestalpine AG group since 2007. Uddeholms AB has 800 Swedish and 3,000 total employees.

History
The company was founded in 1668 by Bengt Gustaf Geijer. The company was then privately held until 1870 when it became a public company named Uddeholms AB. During the second half of the 19th century, the company introduced electricity and railways to their production. The Uddeholm railway was the first private railway in Sweden and also one of the first to be electrified in 1920.

The company was introduced to the United States in the 1830s and in the 1920s a modern international sales organization was created. In 1945, Associated Swedish Steel was created together with four other major Swedish steel producers to sell steel to the new markets in South America, Africa, Middle East and Asia. In 1976, Uddeholm bought the whole of ASSAB and since 1 April 2011, it is fully integrated in Uddeholms AB with the exception of ASSAB Pacific Pte Ltd.

Production
Uddeholms AB's production plant is Hagfors Järnverk (Hagfors Iron mill) in Hagfors, Sweden. There are three production routes. In every route except granulation, the materials are heat treated and machined.

Conventional
This type of production has three phases. First, steel scrap is melted in an Electric Arc Furnace. After melting, the steel is purified in a secondary treatment to remove sulfur, slag and other unwanted materials. In the third step, the steel is poured into an ingot. Different methods such as Up-hill casting and the use of protective noble gases can further improve quality.

Electro-slag remelting (ESR)
In the electro-slag remelting (ESR) process, steel scrap is first melted using the conventional process but is then remelted in a water-cooled form. With this process, a more even microstructure can be achieved which gives completely different properties than a material produced with the conventional method. There are different variants of the electro-slag remelting process where the remelting is done in vacuum or a protective atmosphere.

Powder metallurgy

In the powder metallurgical process, a fine powder is created by spraying a stream of liquid steel with nitrogen under high pressure. The average diameter of the powder is 50-100 µm. The powder is filled into capsules directly in order to avoid contamination. With hot isostatic pressing (HIP), the powder is consolidated to 100% density. The advantage with powder metallurgical tool steels is to have a high degree of alloys without getting segregations in the material. This makes it possible to combine high material hardness with wear resistance.

Metal granulation – GRANSHOT
The GRANSHOT process was developed at UDDEHOLM. In the GRANSHOT process, hot liquid molten metal is poured at a flat surface, dispersing it so that small droplets are created. These metal droplets are immediately cooled in water, creating granules which are dewatered. The process is applicable to iron, steel, stainless steel, ferro alloys and base metals. These granules have ideal metallurgical and logistical properties as to facilitate the use of granules into blast furnaces, electric arc furnaces, AODs, foundries etc. For example, the granules can be used in casting of tools in order to achieve tools with even metallurgical properties. In 2007, the independent and privately owned Swedish engineering company UHT - Uvån Hagfors Teknologi AB, was formed and also took over all intellectual property rights including the trademark GRANSHOT. UDDEHOLM has continued to produce metal granulates, so called Granshots, using their GRANSHOT unit in Hagfors, Sweden.

Products
Uddeholms AB manufacture and refine high alloyed tool steels in long and flat dimensions. Tool steels are mainly used in tools such as molds, knives, tools that are used for manufacturing of different products. Tool steels are used in all manufacturing industries such as automotive, electronics, consumer goods and packaging. Due to their special metallurgical properties, e.g.combinations of hardness, wear resistance, toughness, corrosion resistance, they can also be used for mechanical applications instead of engineering steels.

Cold Work Steels
Cold Work Steels are tool steels used for tools where the work material is cold. The steel is exposed to mechanical forces by the work material. Common problems are wear, chipping, plastic deformation and cracking which can lead to tool failure.
Application areas are stamping, deep drawing, cold extrusion, fine blanking, cold forging, form pressing and rolling.

Hot Work Steels
Hot Work Steels are tool steels that are used for tools where the material is hot. Due to the high temperatures when working with molten metals such as aluminium, iron and brass, the requirements on the tools are very high. High heat resistance and ductility as well as wear resistance are important. Resistance to thermal cyclic stress is also good.
Application areas are casting, extrusion and forging.

Plastic Mold Steel
Plastic Mold Steels are tool steels used for production of plastic parts. The most important characteristics are durability and hardness, toughness, wear resistance, polishability, corrosion resistance, and thermal heat conductivity. Important customer groups are in the automotive, consumer goods industry, electronics and other industries that use plastic components.
Application areas are blow molding, form pressing, form blowing, extrusion and holder materials.

Mechanical components/Mechanical engineering
Mechanical components such as engine parts (shafts cog wheels), machine parts, wear parts can be made of tool steel. The combinations of hardness, toughness, corrosion resistance and other properties of tool steels, makes it possible to replace more traditional engineering steels.

Reference to international tool steel standards

Other

Sponsoring and local engagements

Between 2002 and 2008, Uddeolms AB was name sponsor for the WRC Swedish Rally.

Sources

Manufacturing companies of Sweden
Companies established in 1668
1668 establishments in Sweden
Industrial history of Sweden
Companies based in Värmland County